Baghuapal is a village in mayurbhanj district in Odisha, India. It's by the Budhabalanga River

History 
The village's population mainly sodgop (gohola)  which migrated from jharkhand and gauda and some scheduled caste like sing. 

Baghuapal was a well-known center during the administration of Mughal. The king of Akbar and todarmal's administration was reflected in this village. A Mughal times well and a temple is also situated in center of the village.

Geography 
Baghuapal has a total population of 389 people. There are about 123 houses in Baghuapal village. As per 2019 stats, Baghuapal villages comes under Badasahi assembly & Balasore parliamentary constituency.

Economy

Many of the younger people are employed by the Indian and Orissa governments. Some are working with private organizations, or are involved in their own businesses.

Transport

According to Census 2011 information the location code or village code of Baghuapal village is 390647. Baghuapal village is located in Barsahi Tehsil of Mayurbhanj district in Odisha, India. As per 2009 stats, Sialighaty is the gram panchayat of Baghuapal village.

Baghuapal is also well connected with other cities by road.

Educational institutes

Baghuapal has one school called Govt primary school, Baghuapal. The village has no high schools, colleges, or technical institutes.

Politics

Baghuapal participates equally in electing delegates to the Lok Sabha.

References

https://indiarailinfo.com/station/map/baghuapal-bgpl/7371

Villages in Mayurbhanj district